Dr. Maimon Cohen (born 1947) is a linguist of the Hebrew language. He is on the faculty of Kaye Academic College of Education in Beersheba, Israel.

In 1987, completed his dissertation, which dealt with linguistic aspects of the Qere and Kethiv in the Masoretic Text of Scripture. His adviser was Simcha Kogut.

Cohen continued his work on the Qere and Kethiv in the 1990s, and received the Nehemya Allony Prize in 1998, to fund this project.

Works 

In 2007, he published the results of his research: The Kethib and Qere in the Biblical Text: A Linguistic Analysis of the Various Traditions Based on the Manuscript 'Keter Aram Tsova' (Hebrew), the Hebrew University Magnes Press, Jerusalem.

In this book, Cohen sets out to answer the following questions: 
What are the historical roots of the Qere / Kethiv phenomenon?
How can we explain the inconsistencies in the phenomenon? In one place, the Qere and Kethiv might be exactly the reverse of what they are in a different place.
Is there a relationship early/late between the Kethiv and Qere? That is, is one of them consistently an earlier version, and the other consistently a later one?

After four chapters, on orthography, morphology (and morpho-phonology), syntax (and morpho-syntax), and lexicon and style, Cohen presents his conclusion: the vast majority of occurrences of Qere and Kethiv in Scripture reflect different dialects of the ancient Hebrew language (whether earlier and later, or simultaneous). Only a few occurrences are related to the specific style of Scripture; most occurrences have nothing to do with Scripture in particular, and everything to do with the Hebrew language as a whole. Because of this, he writes in the preface that this book will be interesting not only to people who are concerned with the phenomenon of Qere/Kethiv, and not even only for people who study Biblical orthography, but to linguists of Hebrew in general, and scholars of the Bible in general.

References
</References>

1947 births
Living people
Linguists from Israel